The blue ant (Diamma bicolor), also known as the blue-ant or bluebottle, despite its name and appearance, is not an ant, but rather a species of large, solitary, parasitic wasp sometimes known as a flower wasp. It is native to south and southeast Australia, including the states of Tasmania, New South Wales, Victoria, and South Australia. It is the sole member of the subfamily Diamminae and the genus Diamma, and is both morphologically and behaviorally unusual among members of the family Tiphiidae.

Blue ants have a distinctive metallic blue-green body, with red legs. The cricket is paralysed with venom injected by the female's stinger and an egg is laid upon it so the wasp larva has a ready supply of food. Adults feed on nectar and pollinate various native Australian flowers.

The sting of the blue ant can cause a severe burning sensation and swelling in humans; in rare cases, it can cause a life-threatening reaction (such as anaphylaxis).

External links

Blue-ant Fact File (from the Australian Museum) 
Flower wasps (from the Australian Museum) 
Common names (and image) (from CSIRO Entomology)

Thynnidae
Insects described in 1835
Hymenoptera of Australia